On the Banks of the Wabash is a 1923 American silent rural melodrama film directed by J. Stuart Blackton and produced and distributed by his movie company, Vitagraph Studios. The film stars Mary Carr and among the cast are 14-year-old Madge Evans and James W. Morrison. The cameraman was Nicholas Musuraca. The film is very loosely based on Paul Dresser's song / poem "On the Banks of the Wabash, Far Away". The film was an expensive production, with full-size riverboat steamboat and location shooting. It was one of the last major productions by Vitagraph before they were bought by Warner Bros.

Cast

Preservation
Reportedly, a private collector holds an abridged, or shortened, version of this film.

See also
List of lost films

References

External links

1923 films
American silent feature films
Films directed by J. Stuart Blackton
Vitagraph Studios films
1923 drama films
Silent American drama films
American black-and-white films
Melodrama films
1920s American films